
Gmina Roźwienica is a rural gmina (administrative district) in Jarosław County, Subcarpathian Voivodeship, in south-eastern Poland.

Villages
Gmina Roźwienica contains the villages and settlements of Bystrowice, Chorzów, Cząstkowice, Czudowice, Roźwienica, Rudołowice, Tyniowice, Węgierka, Więckowice, Wola Roźwienicka and Wola Węgierska.

Neighbouring gminas
Gmina Roźwienica is bordered by the gminas of Chłopice, Krzywcza, Pawłosiów, Pruchnik, Rokietnica and Zarzecze.

References

Polish official population figures 2006

Rozwienica
Jarosław County